Mademoiselle Fifi may refer to:
Fifi D'Orsay (1904–1983), Canadian-American actress billed as "Mademoiselle Fifi"
Mademoiselle Fifi (book), a collection of short stories by Guy de Maupassant published in 1882
"Mademoiselle Fifi" (short story), a story from the 1882 collection
Mademoiselle Fifi (opera), an opera composed by César Cui during 1902–1903; adapted from the short story
Mademoiselle Fifi (film), a 1944 film adaptation; based on the short story
Mademoiselle Fifi (dancer), burlesque dancer
Mademoiselle Fifi (cat), a cat owned by John Moisant which was his constant companion while flying

See also
 Fifi (disambiguation)